Christ Evangelical English Lutheran Church, also known as Rugged Cross Baptist Church, is a historic Evangelical Lutheran church at 1084 Lafayette Avenue, 11221, in Bedford-Stuyvesant, Brooklyn, New York, New York.  It was built in 1898–1899 in the Romanesque Revival style. It is faced in cream colored brick with beige brick and terra cotta trim.  The front facade is arranged with a two story tall central gable flanked by asymmetrical towers.

It was listed on the National Register of Historic Places in 2007.

References

Churches in Brooklyn
Properties of religious function on the National Register of Historic Places in Brooklyn
Lutheran churches in New York City